Rejoagung Stadium is a football stadium in the town of Kedungwaru, Tulungagung Regency, East Java, Indonesia. The stadium has a capacity of 7,000 people.

It is the home base of Perseta Tulungagung.

References

Sports venues in Indonesia
Football venues in Indonesia
Multi-purpose stadiums in Indonesia